is a Japanese actor and singer, who was born in Tokyo, Japan.

Career
He began his career as a baby model at under one year of age. He also played Gavroche in the original Japanese cast and later Marius in the Japanese TOHO production of Les Misérables and appears on the 2003 "green" cast recording. His first major role was in 2004 in Shinsengumi!, as Hijikata Toshizō, a role he reprised for the 2006 sequel. This sequel portrays the last day of Hijikata Toshizō, Vice Commander of Shinsengumi and Asa ga Kita he reprised the role eleven years later.

Personal life
He married Maki Horikita on 22 August 2015. and their first child was born in December 2016.

Filmography

Film
 Tales of the Unusual (2000)
 Yumejūya (2007) – Natsume Sōseki
 I Just Didn't Do It (2007) – Tatsuo
 The Majic Hour (2008)
 Higanjima (2010)
 A Ghost of a Chance (2011)
 Ninja Kids!!! (2011)
 Galaxy Turnpike (2015)
 Pretty Cure All Stars (2016) – Trauuma (voice)
 Touken Ranbu (2019) – Oda Nobunaga
 Hitotsubu no Mugi (2019) – Yukiyoshi Shikata
 Startup Girls (2019) – Mizuki
 Talking the Pictures (2019) – Shōzō Makino
 Kamen Rider Reiwa: The First Generation (2019) – Soreo Hiden / Kamen Rider Ichi-gata 
 Extro (2020) – Himself
 What Did You Eat Yesterday? (2021) – Daisaku Kohinata
 Kappei (2022) – Masayoshi
 Shin Ultraman (2022) – Alien Mefilas
 Fullmetal Alchemist: The Revenge of Scar (2022) – Alex Louis Armstrong
 Fullmetal Alchemist: The Final Alchemy (2022) – Alex Louis Armstrong

Television
 Under One Roof (1993) – Fumiya Kashiwagi
 Boys Over Flowers (1996–97) – Rui Hanazawa (voice)
 Under One Roof 2 (1997) – Fumiya Kashiwagi
 Shinsengumi! (2004) – Hijikata Toshizō
 Shinsengumi!: Hijikata Toshizo Saigo no Ichinichi (2006) – Hijikata Toshizō
 Karei-naru Ichizoku (2007) – Ginpei Manpyō
 Kagerō no Tsuji Inemuri Iwane Edo Zōshi (2007–17) – Sakazaki Iwane
 Atashinchi no Danshi (2009) – Shuji Tokita
 Jin (2009–10) – Noguchi
 Wagaya no Rekishi (2010) – Mitsunari Ano
 Mother (2010) – Shunsuke Fujiyoshi
 Taira no Kiyomori (2012) – Fujiwara no Yorinaga
 Asa ga Kita (2015) – Hijikata Toshizō
 Sanada Maru (2016) – Ishida Mitsunari
 Thrill (2017) – Shin'nosuke Shirai
 Totto-chan! (2017) – Moritsuna Kuroyanagi
 Hitoshi Ueki and Nobosemon (2017) – Hitoshi Ueki
 Fūunji tachi (2018) – Hiraga Gennai
 Naruto Hitchō (2018) － Norizuki Gennojō
 Kishū Hanshu Tokugawa Yoshimune (2019) － Tokugawa Yoshimune
 What Did You Eat Yesterday? (2019) － Daisaku Kohinata
 Kamen Rider Zero-One (2019) - Soreo Hiden
 A Warmed Up Love (2020) - Ryō Kamiko
 An Incurable Case of Love (2020) - Rokuro Koishikawa
 The 13 Lords of the Shogun (2022) - Miura Yoshimura

Theatre
 Les Misérables – Gavroche (Original cast (1987–1988)), Marius (2003–2004)
 Stand by Me – Chris (1991), Ace (1994)
 RENT – Mark (1998–1999)
 Cyrano – Christian de Neuvillette (2000–2001)
 Romeo and Juliet – Romeo (2001)
 The Pitchfork Disney – Cosmo (2002)
 Godspell – Jesus (2001–2010)
 Thank you! Broadway! Vol.2 (2002)
 The Pilgrim – Naotaro (2003)
 Tick, Tick... Boom! – Jon (2003–2006)
 Broadway Gala Concert 2005 (2005)
 Little Shop of Horrors – Seymour Krelborn (2005)
 The Last Five Years – Jamie (2005–2010)
 Hedwig and the Angry Inch – Hedwig (2007–2009)
 The Picture of Dorian Gray – Dorian (2009)
 Usani – Snake (2012)
 Mozart the Rock Opera  – Mozart / Salieri (2013)
 Napoleon – Montholon Earl (2013)
 Memphis – Huey Calhoun (2015)
 Wuthering Heights – Heathcliff (2015)
 Anastasia – Gleb (2020)

Video games
Lost Judgment (2021) – Jin Kuwana

Dubbing
Live-action
 Jurassic World (2017 NTV edition), Owen Grady (Chris Pratt)
 Pinocchio, Jiminy Cricket (Joseph Gordon-Levitt)

Animation
 Puss in Boots: The Last Wish, Puss in Boots
 The Lion King II: Simba's Pride, Kovu

Awards

References

External links
 KOJI YAMAMOTO OFFICIAL FANCLUB MAGNUM1031
 

1976 births
Living people
Male actors from Tokyo
Japanese male film actors
Japanese male child actors
Japanese male musical theatre actors
Japanese male television actors
Japanese male voice actors
Singers from Tokyo
20th-century Japanese male actors
21st-century Japanese male actors
20th-century Japanese male singers
20th-century Japanese singers
21st-century Japanese male singers
21st-century Japanese singers